Cyathaspididae is an extinct family in the heterostracan order Cyathaspidiformes.

Cyathaspididae contains most of the genera originally contained within Cyathaspididae, as well as those genera contained within Irregularaspididae, and Poraspididae.  In addition to the type genus, †Cyathaspis, Cyathaspididae contains the following genera: †Americaspis, †Archegonaspis, †Capitaspis, †Dikenaspis, †Dinaspidella, †Homaspidella, †Irregulareaspis, †Nahanniaspis, †Pionaspis, †Poraspis, †Ptomaspis, †Seretaspis, †Steinaspis, †Torpedaspis and †Veronaspis.

References

External links 

 

Cyathaspidida
Prehistoric jawless fish families